Khaled Saif Hamad Ali Al-Senani (Arabic:خالد سيف حماد علي السناني) (born 4 October 1989) is an Emirati footballer. He currently plays as a goalkeeper for Al Wasl on loan from Al Dhafra .

External links

References

Emirati footballers
1989 births
Living people
Al Jazira Club players
Al Dhafra FC players
Al-Wasl F.C. players
UAE Pro League players
Association football goalkeepers